The New Cool is a jazz album collaboration between pianist Bob James and bassist Nathan East, both members of the group Fourplay. The album was released in September 18, 2015 on the Yamaha Entertainment Group label for Tappan Zee Records. The track "Crazy" was released as a single a few days before.

Track listing
All tracks composed by Bob James; except where indicated
“The New Cool”
“Oliver’s Bag” (Nathan East, Jeff Babko)
“All Will Be Revealed”
“Midnight Magic/Love Me As Though There Were No Tomorrow” (James/Harold Adamson, Jimmy McHugh)
“Crazy” (featuring Vince Gill) (Willie Nelson)
“How Deep Is the Ocean” (Irving Berlin)
“Canto Y La Danza” (East, Babko)
“Waltz for Judy” (East, Babko)
“Seattle Sunrise”
“Ghost of a Chance” (Bing Crosby, Ned Washington, Victor Young)
“Turbulence”
“House of Blue” (U.S. bonus track)

Personnel
 Bob James - piano, keyboards, arranger, conductor
 Nathan East - bass guitar, double bass
 Nashville Recording Orchestra - orchestral backing

References

External links
 Official site

2015 albums
Albums produced by Bob James (musician)
albums produced by Nathan East